Cleora Butler (1901-1985) was a chef, caterer and cookbook writer based in Tulsa, Oklahoma.

She is the author of the 1985 book Cleora's Kitchens: The Memoir of a Cook and Eight Decades of Great American Food, a memoir about her life as a house cook in Tulsa.

Gourmet magazine named Cleora's Kitchens the best cookbook of the year.

References

External links 

 
 Cleora Butler at the Legacy Quilt Project – Museum of Food and Drink
 Hidden Kitchens: Talking Recipes: Cleora Butler's Baked Fudge - National Public Radio

African-American chefs
1901 births
1985 deaths
American cookbook writers
Writers from Tulsa, Oklahoma
Chefs from Oklahoma
Women cookbook writers
20th-century American non-fiction writers
20th-century American women writers
American women non-fiction writers